The Bagakay is an ancient Filipino weapon made of bamboo. It is a two pointed wooden dart type of weapon about ten inches in length thrown at an enemy at close quarters and were generally thrown five at a time increasing the possibility of hitting the target. It can be made from small tree branches cut in the proper length and sharpened at both ends or made from hollow bamboo filled with clay for additional weight and easy throwing.

History
The bagakay was usually used to hunt birds before the Spanish Colonial period. It has evolved into a projectile weapon against the Spanish colonists during the colonization era. Bagakay may also connote a long bamboo spear

References

Filipino melee weapons
Spears